Cola elegans is a species of trees, classified in the family Malvaceae, subfamily Sterculioideae (or treated in the separate family Sterculiaceae). It is found in Gabon.

References

External links

 Cola elegans at Tropicos
 Cola elegans at Catalogue of Life

elegans
Plants described in 2014